Benedict Tisbe Fernandez III (born December 13, 1984), is a Filipino professional basketball player who last played for San Miguel Beermen in the ASEAN Basketball League.

Draft
Fernandez was drafted by Barako Bull Energy Boosters in 2009, 12th overall.

Professional career
Fernandez played 9 games for the Barako Bull during the 2009-10 PBA Philippine Cup and averaged 3.78 points, 0.67 rebounds and 1 assist.

Fernandez then played for the Cebuana Lhuillier Gems in the PBA D-League, leading the team to a runner-up finish, losing to the NLEX Road Warriors in the finals. He then played for the Philippine Patriots in the ASEAN Basketball League, where he led the team to a team-high scoring effort in the title-clinching loss against the Chang Thailand Slammers in the 2011 ABL finals. Fernandez then suited up for the San Miguel Beermen in the 2012 ABL season.

References

External links
PBA Online! Profile

1984 births
Living people
Filipino men's basketball players
Point guards
Sportspeople from Baguio
Basketball players from Benguet
FEU Tamaraws basketball players
Barako Bull Energy Boosters players
Barako Bull Energy Boosters draft picks